Naganowski (feminine: Naganowska) is a Polish-language surname. It may refer to:

Edmund Naganowski (1853-1915), Polish  publicist and writer
Egon Naganowski (1913-2000), Polish literary critic, essayist, and literary translator
 (1914-1990) Polish award-winning translator from German

Polish-language surnames